Gadzhibekov, sometimes transliterated as Hajibeyov, is a surname. There was a noted Azerbaijani family that worked in theatre and music with this family name. 

Notable people with the surname include:

 Albert Gadzhibekov (born 1988), Russian footballer
 Ali Gadzhibekov (born 1989), Russian footballer

People with the surname Hajibeyov 
 Osman Hajibeyov (1924–1979), Azerbaijani theatrical actor of Soviet Azerbaijan.
 Soltan Hajibeyov (1919–1974), Azerbaijani composer
 Uzeyir Hajibeyov (1885–1948), Azerbaijani playwright, composer, conductor, publicist, and social figure
 Zulfugar Hajibeyov (1884–1950), Azerbaijani composer, and musical comedy theatre

See also